Bespoke BBQ Company, based in Gloucestershire, England, is a company run by Jack Henriques that manufactures custom barbecues. It is the manufacturer of the God-Grilla.

The company was featured in the UK press in August 2010 when it unveiled a huge barbecue, dubbed by the press as 'God-Grilla', which weighed two tonnes, and required three operators to run at full capacity.  It was constructed on the same principle as a smaller version.  Together the two barbecues are known as the "Cripps Barn Models," after Cripps Catering who commissioned them both for their two wedding venues, named "Cripps Barn" and "Stone Barn," both located in the Cotswold District.

References

Further reading
 ‘God-grilla’: The world's largest barbecue | Metro.co.uk
 Meat world's biggest BBQ.(News) - The Mirror (London, England) | HighBeam Research 

Companies based in Gloucestershire
Manufacturing companies established in 2009
Cooking appliance brands
2009 establishments in England
English brands